Isoteinon is a genus of skipper butterflies in the family Hesperiidae.

Species
The following species are recognised in the genus Isoteinon:
 Isoteinon abjecta (Snellen, 1872)
 Isoteinon lamprospilus C. & R. Felder, 1862

References

Natural History Museum Lepidoptera genus database

External links
Tree of life

Hesperiinae
Hesperiidae genera